The homonym leak may refer to a container or covering) accidentally losing or admitting content, especially liquid or gas, through a hole or crack.

Places
Old Leake and New Leake, Lincolnshire, UK
West Leake and East Leake, Nottinghamshire, UK
Leake, North Yorkshire, UK
Leake County, Mississippi, United States
Leake Township, Nevada County, Arkansas, United States
Lake Leake, Tasmania, Australia

People
Arthur Martin-Leake (1874–1953), awarded two Victoria Crosses
Bernard Elgey Leake (b. 1932), British geologist
George Leake (1856–1902), Australian politician
Hugh Martin-Leake (1878–1977), British economic botanist
Javon Leake (born 1998), American football player
John Leake (disambiguation) several people
John Leake (1656–1720), British Admiral
John George Leake (1752–1827), lawyer who founded the Leake and Watts Children's Home
Joseph Bloomfield Leake (1828–1918), American Civil War Brevet Brigadier General and U.S. District Attorney for the Northern District of Illinois
Mike Leake (b. 1987), a baseball player
Walter Leake (1769–1825), US politician
William Leake (disambiguation), several people
Willie Mae James Leake (1932-1997), American politician

See also
Leak (disambiguation)